Kinsman is a village in Grundy County, Illinois, United States. The population was 99 at the 2010 census.

Geography
Kinsman is located at  (41.190598, -88.569808).

Demographics

As of the census of 2000, there were 109 people, 46 households, and 31 families residing in the village. The racial makeup of the village was 96.33% White, 2.75% from other races, and 0.92% from two or more races. Hispanic or Latino of any race were 12.84% of the population.

There were 46 households, out of which 23.9% had children under the age of 18 living with them, 52.2% were married couples living together, 13.0% had a female householder with no husband present, and 32.6% were non-families. 32.6% of all households were made up of individuals, and 17.4% had someone living alone who was 65 years of age or older. The average household size was 2.37 and the average family size was 2.94.

In the village, the population was spread out, with 24.8% under the age of 18, 5.5% from 18 to 24, 24.8% from 25 to 44, 27.5% from 45 to 64, and 17.4% who were 65 years of age or older. The median age was 42 years. For every 100 females, there were 101.9 males. For every 100 females age 18 and over, there were 90.7 males.

The median income for a household in the village was $42,083, and the median income for a family was $47,083. Males had a median income of $35,536 versus $20,000 for females. The per capita income for the village was $20,011. None of the population and none of the families were below the poverty line.

2009 FBI Raid
In October 2009, the Federal Bureau of Investigation, along with immigration officials and the state police, conducted a raid on an Islamic slaughterhouse in Kinsman. The town mayor, county sheriff, and local residents were very surprised by this action. After the raid, authorities revealed that two individuals associated with the slaughterhouse were charged with terrorism-related offenses.

References

Villages in Grundy County, Illinois
Villages in Illinois